The Citroën C-Triomphe is a mid-size sedan produced for the Chinese market by Dongfeng Peugeot-Citroën, a joint venture between the French PSA Group (Peugeot-Citroën) and the Chinese manufacturer Dongfeng.

Overview
This new model range was designed to supplement other Chinese models in the range such as the Fukang and the Elysée, rather than being any direct replacement.

In April 2007, Citroën announced that the four-door C4 would be built in Argentina. The Argentinian and Brazilian versions are sold as the C4 Pallas in some South American and European markets.
 
The car is essentially a notchback sedan version of the European C4 model, since the Chinese market prefers traditional three-box sedans over hatchbacks. It did not keep the designation, however, because in Chinese the number "4" is unlucky. This caused the C-Triomphe sedan to be classified in large family car class. The C-Triomphe has a number of unique features, such as an integrated air freshener which allows the driver to choose the smell of the interior.

External links
 Citroën China
 Dong Feng-Peugeot-Citroën Automobile
 Citroën C-Triomphe at Citroenet
C-Triomphe images

C-Triomphe
Cars of China
Cars introduced in 2006

it:Citroën C4#Le altre C4